Bobby Allen Hodge (born May 31, 1945), better known as Catfish Hodge, is an American blues musician.

Early life and education
Hodge was born and grew up in Detroit, Michigan, United States. His parents were from rural Kentucky and exposed him to blues, country, and gospel music.

Career
Catfish Hodge formed the Catfish Band, in which he sang and played guitar. The band performed in the 1960s Detroit Rock scene, opening up for Bob Seger, Black Sabbath, Ted Nugent, and played the Fillmore East. He played with the 1980s band Bluesbusters, which released two albums.

During this period he also made frequent trips to the New Orleans area. Combining the sounds from Detroit and New Orleans, Hodge put out the album Soap's Opera, which featured Bonnie Raitt and Dr. John.

In 1980, Hodge was signed to Adelphi Records. That year he formed a band called Chicken Legs, which toured 17 cities.

In 1983, he and his brother Dallas Hodge formed a band called the Hodge Brothers Band, and performed music from the Chicken Legs album.

In 1996, Hodge recorded a children's album, Adventures at Catfish Pond.

Personal life
He was married to animator Kathleen Quaife-Hodge, and they had two sons, Curtis and Max.

Discography 
  1970:	Get Down
  1970:	Live Catfish
  1971:	Empathy
  1973:	Boogie Man Gonna Get Ya
  1974:	Dinosaurs and Alleycats
  1975:	Soap Opera's
  1976:	An Evening with Catfish Hodge
  1979:	Eye Witness Blues / Bout With the Blues
  1979:	Live at the Bayou
  1981:	Catfish Hodge & Chicken Legs (Freebo)
  1981:    Bout with the Blues
  1981:	This Time (Bluesbusters)
  1986:	Accept No Substitute (Bluesbusters)
  1994:	Catfish Blues
  1995:	Like A Big Dog Barking
  1996:	Adventures at Catfish Pond
  1997:	Bare Necessities
  2001:	Let's Eat
  2002:	Twenty Years
  2006:	Communication
  2014:	Different Strokes

References

Other sources
Encyclopedia of Popular Music, Colin Larkin, Bish Bash Books, 5th Edition, September 14, 2007, 

1945 births
Living people
American blues guitarists
Guitarists from Detroit
American male guitarists
20th-century American guitarists
20th-century American male musicians